István Ballér or Balliér ( August 28, 1760 – April 2, 1835) was an ethnic Slovene Lutheran priest, dean of Zala and Somogy, and writer. He lived and worked in the Kingdom of Hungary.

Born in the Slovene March (Prekmurje) in the village of Lončarovci (then officially Gerőháza), he received his schooling in Őrség and Nemescsó and higher education in Sopron. He was a cantor and then teacher among the Somogy Slovenes in Kissomlyó, relocated to Porrogszentkirály in 1784, and was then dean of the county from 1805 onward.

Ballér strongly opposed the official replacement of Prekmurje Slovene by Hungarian in the 1830s. He wrote several hymns in the Prekmurje dialect of Slovene.

Literature
 Vili Kerčmar: Evangeličanska cerkev na Slovenskem, Murska Sobota 1995.
 Franc Šebjanič: Protestantsko gibanje panonskih Slovencev, Pomurska založba 1977.

See also
 List of Slovene writers and poets in Hungary
 Magyarization

Slovenian writers and poets in Hungary
Slovenian Lutheran clergy
Slovenian writers
1760 births
1835 deaths
18th-century Hungarian male writers
19th-century Hungarian male writers
People from the Municipality of Moravske Toplice